Endre Csillag (born October 12, 1957 in Budapest) is a Hungarian guitarist. His nickname is Csuka (means northern pike or sneaker).

Guitarist 

 Hobó Blues Band 
 Kormorán
 Edda Művek
 Culture Kings
 Funk Bizzness
 D.Nagy és a Frakció
 Németh Gábor Project
 Bikini
 Rolls Frakció
 Deák Bill Gyula

Music author 

 Kormorán
 Edda Művek
 D.Nagy és a Frakció
 Heaven
 Kalapács József
 Hard
 Deák Bill Gyula

Discography

External links 
 http://www.bikininet.hu/index.php 
 http://www.csillagendre.freeweb.hu 

Hungarian guitarists
Male guitarists
Musicians from Budapest
1957 births
Living people
Hungarian male musicians